Grene is a surname. Notable people with the surname include:

Christopher Grene (1629–1697), Jesuit priest
David Grene (1913–2002), professor of classics
Gregory Grene, American musician
Marjorie Grene, American philosopher
Martin Grene, English Jesuit

See also
Greene (disambiguation)
Green (disambiguation)